

The Gómez Residence is a historic house in Mayagüez, Puerto Rico. It was designed by architect Francisco Porrata-Doría in a Mission/Spanish Revival, neo-Andalusí style, and was built in 1933.

The house was added to the U.S. National Register of Historic Places in 1988.

See also

National Register of Historic Places listings in Mayagüez, Puerto Rico

Notes

References

External links
Summary sheet from the Puerto Rico State Historic Preservation Office 
Photo from the Puerto Rico State Historic Preservation Office

National Register of Historic Places in Mayagüez, Puerto Rico
Houses on the National Register of Historic Places in Puerto Rico
Houses completed in 1933
Spanish Colonial Revival architecture
1933 establishments in Puerto Rico
Moorish Revival architecture in Puerto Rico